The Warburg effect may refer to:

 Warburg effect (embryology)
 Warburg effect (oncology)
 Warburg effect (plant physiology)

See also
 Warburg hypothesis